Time Burial is a collection of science fiction, fantasy and horror stories by American writer  Howard Wandrei. It was released in 1995 by Fedogan & Bremer in an edition of 1,500 copies.  Most of the stories originally appeared in the magazines Unknown, Astounding Stories, Spicy Mystery Stories, Weird Tales and The Arkham Collector.  A collection of this title, but with different contents, was originally announced by Arkham House but never published.

Contents

 Introduction, by D. H. Olson
 "The Hexer"
 "The Black Farm"
 "Macklin’s Little Friend"
 "The Glass Coffin"
 "Don’t Go Haunting"
 "’Tis Claude"
 "The Wall"
 "Here Lies"
 "Exit Willy Carney"
 "The God Box"
 "The Missing Ocean"
 "The Hand of the O’Mecca"
 "Master-the-Third"
 "Over Time’s Threshold"
 "Time Burial"
 "O Little Nightmare!"
 "In the Triangle"
 "The Other"
 "After You, Montague"
 "The Monocle"

References

Sources

1995 short story collections
Science fiction short story collections
Fantasy short story collections
Horror short story collections
1990s science fiction works
Fedogan & Bremer books